Christine Elizabeth Adamson is an Australian judge. She has been a Judge of the Supreme Court of New South Wales since October 2011.

She was educated at Walford Anglican School for Girls and the University of Adelaide, where she graduated with honours in law in 1986 and won the Stow Medal and Bennett Medal for academic distinction. She was admitted as a solicitor in 1986 and worked as a legal officer for the Commonwealth Attorney-General's Department for two years, then from March 1988 worked for the Australian Government Solicitor's Office. She taught property law at the Australian National University in 1987 and Constitutional Law at the University of Sydney in 1989.

Adamson was admitted to the New South Wales Bar in February 1989 at the relatively young age of 26. Her practice as a barrister included trade practices, administrative law, constitutional law, professional negligence, personal injury and disciplinary matters, and although initially appearing often in the Administrative Appeals Tribunal and Administrative Decisions Tribunal of New South Wales, she later developed a significant Supreme Court practice. She attained senior counsel status in 2003, and was appointed chairperson of the Council of Law Reporting for New South Wales in 2004.  She represented officers of a failed insurer before the HIH Insurance Royal Commission and was counsel assisting the Independent Commission Against Corruption in their investigations of state MPs Karyn Paluzzano and Angela D'Amore.

She was appointed to the Supreme Court by Attorney-General Greg Smith with effect from October 2011. In 2017, she presided over the trial of former state minister Ian Macdonald and union official John Maitland, sentencing McDonald to at least seven years imprisonment and Maitland to at least four years' imprisonment. The sentences were quashed on 25 February 2019 by the Court of Criminal Appeal, which held that Adamson had not properly directed the jury.

Adamson is the daughter of former South Australian state MP Jennifer Cashmore. Her sister, Frances Adamson, was Australia's first female Ambassador to China and, in October 2021, became the 36th Governor of South Australia.

References

Living people
Date of birth missing (living people)
Judges of the Supreme Court of New South Wales
Australian women judges
University of Adelaide alumni
20th-century Australian lawyers
21st-century Australian judges
Year of birth missing (living people)
21st-century women judges
20th-century Australian women